Michael Phelps (born 1985) is an American former swimmer.

Michael Phelps may also refer to:

Michael E. Phelps (born 1939), American co-developer of positron emission tomography
Mike Phelps (born 1961), American basketball player